Faith Hope Love is the third studio album by the American rock band King's X.

"Six Broken Soldiers" is the first King's X song to feature drummer Jerry Gaskill on lead vocals.

Track listing

Personnel
Dug* Pinnick - lead & backing vocals, bass guitar
Ty Tabor - lead & backing vocals, lead, rhythm & acoustic guitars, sitar
Jerry Gaskill - lead & backing vocals, drums, percussion

Additional personnel
 Galactic Cowboys (Monty Colvin, Alan Doss, Ben Huggins, Dane Sonnier) - backing vocals on "Mr. Wilson" & "Faith Hope Love"
 Max Dyer - cello on "Six Broken Soldiers", "Faith Hope Love" & "Legal Kill"
 Erik Ralske - French horn on "Six Broken Soldiers"
 Little Willie Sammy Taylor - pipe organ on "Six Broken Soldiers"
 Kemper Crabb - soprano recorder on "Legal Kill"

Reception
Faith, Hope, Love proved to be King's X's most commercially successful album, nearly reaching gold status.

The album was listed at #52 in the 2001 book CCM Presents: The 100 Greatest Albums in Christian Music.

Chart performance

Singles - Billboard (United States)

References

External links
Official King's X Site, Accessed on July 10, 2005.
Addition information about the album, Accessed on April 26, 2006.
site francophone, Accessed on July 24, 2006.

King's X albums
1990 albums
Megaforce Records albums